James William Hazeldean was a Scottish professional footballer who played as an outside left in the Scottish League for Heart of Midlothian.

Personal life 
Hazeldean served as a private in McCrae's Battalion and the Labour Corps during the First World War. He was shot in the thigh on the first day on the Somme and was later discharged from the army. After the war, Hazeldean became a bottle blower.

Career statistics

References 

Scottish footballers
Scottish Football League players
British Army personnel of World War I
Heart of Midlothian F.C. players
Year of birth missing
Year of death missing
Place of birth missing
McCrae's Battalion
Royal Scots soldiers
Association football outside forwards
Royal Pioneer Corps soldiers
British shooting survivors
Glassblowers